"Another Day" is the third and final single released from British R&B singer Lemar's debut album, Dedicated (2003). The single became Lemar's third consecutive top-10 hit in the United Kingdom, peaking at number nine in February 2004.

Track listings
CD 1
 "Another Day" (radio edit)
 "Another Day" (Blacksmith R&B rub)

CD 2
 "Another Day" (album version)
 "I Believe in a Thing Called Love" (Live on Jo Whiley)
 "I Need a Girl"
 "Another Day" (video)

12-inch vinyl
 "Another Day" (Blacksmith R&B Rub 12-inch Mix)
 "Another Day" (Blacksmith Club Mix)
 "Another Day" (Kings of Soul Mix)

Charts

Weekly charts

Year-end charts

References

2003 songs
2004 singles
Lemar songs
Song recordings produced by Brian Rawling
[[Category:Sony Music UK singles]